Sean Michael Rosenthal (born June 19, 1980) is an American beach volleyball player, playing as a defender. He is best known for his high leaping ability, which has earned him the nickname of "Superman". Rosenthal has an entourage called "Rosie's Raiders", which is composed of close friends of his who enjoy going to his various tournaments to support him. He and his former partner, Jake Gibb, represented the United States at the 2008 Olympic Games and 2012 Olympic Games in beach volleyball.

Personal life
Sean Rosenthal was born in Torrance, California. He was raised by his mother, Laura Hurlburt. He attended Redondo Union High School. Rosenthal is married to Kayce Matthess and has three children with her.

Professional career 
At the age of 16, he made his professional debut in the AVP. Sean's partner in his first season was Dale Smith. He has gone on to pair up with players like Jake Gibb and Phil Dalhausser. Some of his professional accomplishments include 11 tour victories in the AVP, Best Server in the AVP in 2002, Best Defensive Player in the AVP in 2007, and participation in the 2008 and 2012 Olympics.

International Competitions 
Sean and partner Jake Gibb competed in eight FIVB events in 2008 as part of the Olympic qualifying process and earned $42,650 on the FIVB tour in 2008. In 2007, Rosenthal and Gibb played in six international events, with fifth being their best finish. They won $26,950.

Olympics
Rosenthal made his Olympic debut at the 2008 Summer Olympics with Gibb. The team made it to the quarterfinals before losing to the Brazilian duo Ricardo Santos and Emanuel Rego. At the 2012 Summer Olympics, Rosenthal and Gibb again made it to the quarter-finals where they lost to Martins Plavins and Janis Smedins of Latvia. Shortly after the 2012 Summer Olympics, Gibb and Rosenthal split up as teammates after six years as partners.

Previous partners
2018 – Chase Budinger 
2013-15 - Phil Dalhausser, Theo Brunner 
2006-12 - Jake Gibb
2003-05 - Larry Witt
2002 - Mark Williams
2001 - Casey Jennings, Jeff Carlucci, Mark Williams
2000 - Jeff Carlucci
1997 - Dale Smith

Awards
2012 - FIVB Most Outstanding Player
2012 - FIVB Team Of The Year (Jake Gibb)
2012 - FIVB Tour Champion (Jake Gibb)
2007 - AVP Best Defensive Player
2006 - FIVB Top Rookie
2002 - AVP Best Server

References

External links
 
 

1980 births
Living people
American men's beach volleyball players
Olympic beach volleyball players of the United States
Beach volleyball players at the 2008 Summer Olympics
Beach volleyball players at the 2012 Summer Olympics
Beach volleyball defenders
Sportspeople from Redondo Beach, California
21st-century American people